John Mark Bailey (born November 4, 1961) is an American former professional baseball player and coach. He played in Major League Baseball as a catcher from 1984 to 1992 for the Houston Astros and San Francisco Giants.

Amateur career
A native of Springfield, Missouri, Bailey graduated from Glendale High School in 1979. He played college basketball and college baseball at Southwest Missouri State University, and was twice named an NCAA Division II All-American infielder. In 1981, he played collegiate summer baseball with the Wareham Gatemen of the Cape Cod Baseball League. In 1982, he helped lead SMS to the NCAA Division II baseball tournament. Bailey was selected by the Astros in the 6th round of the 1982 MLB Draft, and opted to forgo his senior year at SMS to sign professionally.

Professional career
Bailey made his major league debut with Houston in 1984, and was the team's primary catcher in 1984 and 1985. His most productive year at the plate came in 1985, when he hit .265 in 114 games with 10 home runs.

The Astros traded Bailey to the Montreal Expos midway through the 1988 season. He spent the remainder of 1988 in the Expos' minor league system, and spent 1989 in the New York Mets' Triple-A Tidewater Tides. After the 1989 season, Bailey signed with the Giants as a free agent, and appeared in a handful of games at the major league level with San Francisco in 1990 and 1992.

In 340 games over 7 major league seasons, Bailey posted a .220 batting average (209-for-949) with 101 runs, 24 home runs and 101 RBI.

Coaching career
Bailey has coached in various capacities within the Astros system since 1998.

Honors
In 2016, Bailey was inducted into the Springfield Area Sports Hall of Fame, and in 2017, he was inducted into the Missouri Sports Hall of Fame.

References

External links
, or Baseball Reference (Minor and Independent Leagues), or Pura Pelota (Venezuelan Winter League)

1961 births
Living people
Abilene Prairie Dogs players
Asheville Tourists players
Auburn Astros players
Baseball players from Missouri
Beaumont Bullfrogs players
Columbus Astros players
Houston Astros players
Houston Astros coaches
Indianapolis Indians players
Major League Baseball catchers
Major League Baseball pitching coaches
Missouri State Bears baseball players
Navegantes del Magallanes players
American expatriate baseball players in Venezuela
Phoenix Firebirds players
San Francisco Giants players
Sportspeople from Springfield, Missouri
Tidewater Tides players
Tucson Toros players
Wareham Gatemen players